The Women's 4x400 metres relay event at the 2013 European Athletics U23 Championships was held in Tampere, Finland, at Ratina Stadium on 14 July.

Medalists

Results

Final
14 July 2013 / 18:40

Participation
According to an unofficial count, 24 athletes from 6 countries participated in the event.

References

4 x 400 metres relay
Relays at the European Athletics U23 Championships